Edward J. Dorn (January 12, 1854 – December 10, 1937) was a captain in the United States Navy.

Early life 
On January 12, 1854, Dorn was born in Potosi, Wisconsin.

Education 
In June 1874, Dorn graduated from the United States Naval Academy.

Career 
In June 1887, Dorn was promoted to a Lieutenant.

In 1901, Dorn was briefly acting-Commandant (and therefore acting-Governor) of American Samoa while Commandant Benjamin Franklin Tilley was away on leave.

On 20 April 1904, Captain Edward John Dorn took command of USS Castine.

Based in part on this experience, he was appointed as the Governor of Guam on December 28, 1907 and remained there until November 5, 1910.

During World War I, he was the head of the Navy Relief Society.

Personal life 
In 1880, Dorn married Syble Halpine.

On December 10, 1937, Dorn died in Washington, D.C.

References

External links

 Two Captains, Two Regimes: Benjamin Franklin Tilley and Richard Phillips Leary, America’s Pacific Island Commanders, 1899-1901 at ijnhonline.org

1854 births
1937 deaths
People from Potosi, Wisconsin
Military personnel from Wisconsin
Governors of Guam
United States Naval Academy alumni
United States Navy officers